Celidosphenella is a genus of tephritid  or fruit flies in the family Tephritidae.

Species
Celidosphenella bella (Blanchard, 1854)
Celidosphenella benoisti (Séguy, 1933)
Celidosphenella diespasmena (Schiner, 1868)
Celidosphenella maculata Hendel, 1914
Celidosphenella poecila (Schiner, 1868)
Celidosphenella simulata (Malloch, 1933)
Celidosphenella stonei (Stuardo Ortiz, 1946)
Celidosphenella vidua (Hering, 1942)

References

Tephritinae
Tephritidae genera
Diptera of South America